John Carter Bacot (February 7, 1933 – April 7, 2005) was president of The Bank of New York for eight years and he was chairman and CEO for sixteen years. He remained on the Board of Directors until 2003.

Biography 
Bacot spent his early years in Utica, New York. After graduating from Hamilton College in 1955 and from Cornell Law School in 1958. He worked briefly for a Utica law firm. 

Bacot joined The Bank of New York in 1960. He was named vice chair of the company in 1975 and president in 1979. He was the chairman and chief executive from 1982 until 1998 and remained on the board until 2003.

While Bacot was the chairman, the bank's assets increase from $11.5 billion to $60 billion. Also, the bank's net annual income increased from $58 million to $1.1 billion.

On April 7, 2005 The Bank of New York Company announced that Bacot had died earlier that day from cardiac arrest at his home in Montclair, New Jersey at age 72. He had a forty-three-year career at The Bank of New York.

Bacot died on April 7, 2005 due to cardiac arrest. He is survived by his wife, Shirley Schou; two daughters, Susan Bacot and Betsy Bacot-Aigner; and two grandsons.

References

1933 births
2005 deaths
American chief executives of financial services companies
Hamilton College (New York) alumni
Cornell Law School alumni
Place of death missing

20th-century American businesspeople
American chief operating officers